Lagaip Rural LLG is a local-level government (LLG) of Enga Province, Papua New Guinea.

Wards
01. Mamale
02. Wapele
03. Kembos
04. Komaip
05. Wanepos
06. Takuup
07. Kasap
08. Yangiyangi
09. Kindarep
10. Yakenda
11. Keriapaka
12. Aiyak (Aiyaka)
13. Ipai
14. Lyonge
15. Paip
16. Liop
17. Yaki Due
18. Sirunki
19. Yailingis
20. Kaipare
21. Pore
22. Tukusenda (Tukisenta)
23. Nagulama
24. Yomondi
25. Kusi
26. Paindako
27. Kulita
28. Watali
29. Pipingus
30. Kuimas
81. Laiagam Urban

References

Local-level governments of Enga Province